Christopher Patrick Kenny  (13 March 1937 – 2 February 2016) was an Irish-born New Zealand boxing coach. He coached New Zealand squads and teams to the Commonwealth and Olympic Games. He coached his son Michael Kenny to a gold medal at the 1990 Commonwealth Games.

In the 2012 New Year Honours, Kenny was appointed an Officer of the New Zealand Order of Merit for services to boxing.

Kenny died at his home in Titahi Bay on 2 February 2016.

References

1937 births
2016 deaths
New Zealand boxing trainers
Irish emigrants to New Zealand
Officers of the New Zealand Order of Merit